Kadıköy Haldun Taner Stage is a theatre venue located in Kadıköy district of Istanbul, Turkey. It is owned by Istanbul Metropolitan Municipality and operated by its City Theatres (Şehir Tiyatroları) division. The theatre is named in honor of the Turkish playwright Haldun Taner (1915-1986).

Situated on the landing square (İskele Meydanı), the building, which hosts the theatre today, was constructed as the first modern market hall in Istanbul between 1925 and 1927. However, it stood vacant for a period of ten years since the traders in the agricultural marketing business did not want to be tenant. In order to utilize the vacant building, some parts of it was used by the fire department, and some parts served as depot for scrap vehicles. Its purposeful usage began in the 1940s, lasting until the mid 1970s.

After its complete renovation in 1984, the building was assigned to Istanbul University for use as conservatory in 1986. Finally, the ground floor of the building was transformed into a theatre venue in 1989.

Kadıköy Haldun Taner Stage has a seating capacity of 286.

Past productions

2009
 Kar (Snow) by Orhan Pamuk
2013
 Ateşli Sabır (Ardiente paciencia) by Antonio Skármeta
 Perşembenin Hanımları (Les Dames du jeudi) by Loleh Bellon
 Ocak by Turgut Özakman
 Para by Necip Fazıl Kısakürek
 Yolcu by Nazım Hikmet Ran

See also
 Süreyya Opera House
 Harbiye Muhsin Ertuğrul Stage

References

Theatres in Istanbul
Buildings and structures completed in 1927
Redevelopment projects in Istanbul
Theatres completed in 1989
1989 establishments in Turkey
Kadıköy